Léa Roussel (born 5 July 1992) is a French female acrobatic gymnast. With partner Claire Philouze, Roussel achieved bronze in the 2014 Acrobatic Gymnastics World Championships.

With Claire Philouze, she reached the final of the seventh series of France's got talent in December 2012, finishing in fourth place.

References

People from Sète
1992 births
Living people
French acrobatic gymnasts
Female acrobatic gymnasts
Medalists at the Acrobatic Gymnastics World Championships
Sportspeople from Hérault
21st-century French women